Booragoon bus station is a Transperth bus station located next to the Westfield Booragoon shopping centre in Booragoon, Western Australia. It has 13 stands and is served by nine Transperth routes, in addition to a number of school buses and School Special services.

The original Booragoon bus station opened in September 1976.

Booragoon bus station, is located at the corner of Riseley and Marmion Streets, and is the fourth bus station to have existed on the shopping centre premises, being built upon the site previously occupied by the Booragoon Hotel. Previous iterations of the bus station have existed at various locations on the premises, including at the main entrance from Riseley Street, adjacent the Booragoon Hotel (slightly west of the current ANZ Branch) and adjacent to Davy Street before the road was rerouted as a result of car-park expansions. Continued expansion of the shopping centre has necessitated construction of new stations.

Bus routes

Platform A

Platform B

Platform C

Platform D

References

External links
Access map Transperth
Hames Sharley Booragoon Bus Station Information, note this site describes the construction of only two 'platforms' (presumably the platforms for 'B/C' and 'D' stands)
Service changes affecting Booragoon services as of 7 October 2018

Bus stations in Perth, Western Australia